Great rhombidodecahedron
Small rhombidodecahedron